Rhombodera mjobergi is a species of praying mantis of the family Mantidae. It is native to Asia.

See also
List of mantis genera and species

References

Further reading

 

M
Mantodea of Asia
Insects described in 1930